A ketch is a sailing craft with two masts.

Ketch may also refer to:
 Ketch Harbour, Nova Scotia, Canada

People with the surname
 Daniel Ketch, a Marvel Comics character
 Jack Ketch (died 1686), English executioner
 Megan Ketch, American actress

See also
 
 Catch (disambiguation)